

Alleles

References

0